Axes, plural of axe and of axis, may refer to

 Axes (album), a 2005 rock album by the British band Electrelane
 a possibly still empty plot (graphics)

See also
 Axis (disambiguation)
 Axess (disambiguation)
 Axxess (disambiguation)